Petra Kehl is a German scholar of the Middle Ages, specifically of the veneration of saints. Kehl's monograph (derived from her doctoral dissertation) Kult und Nachleben des hl. Bonifatius (1993) is one of two monographs on the veneration of Saint Boniface (the other is by Lutz von Padberg). Her study was praised by one reviewer as written "with meticulous care", and by another as "an account that deserves wide recognition (and translation into English), a standard for scholarship for years to come". Kehl lives in Fulda, where she runs a publishing company specializing in historical fiction, religious literature, and children's literature.

Bibliography

References

External links
Verlag Kehl

Living people
German medievalists
Women medievalists
People from Fulda
German publishers (people)
Year of birth missing (living people)
German women historians